The following highways are numbered 843:

United States